"Can't Get Enough" is a song by American singer Becky G, featuring American rapper Pitbull. It was originally released on July 13, 2013, as the second track from her EP, Play It Again. It was later released as a single to Latin radio on March 29, 2014.

The song was able to chart at number one on the Latin Rhythm Airplay chart in the United States. The music video was then released on June 4, 2014. A Spanish version was released on May 1 to digital platforms; it features Gomez singing in Spanish while Pitbull's verses remain in English.

Background 
In an interview with Rolling Stone, Gomez revealed that the single "happened in pieces", as it was originally a solo song. After she wrote the hook, DJ Buddha sent the track to Pitbull, who replied with some verse ideas, which replaced Gomez' second verse and were also included in the Spanish version of the song.

Music video
The official music video for the song was released on Gomez's Vevo channel on YouTube on June 4, 2014. As of November 2019, the music video has over 40 million views.

Live performances
Gomez performed the original version during the 2014 Radio Disney Music Awards (RDMAs).

Chart performance
The song topped the Latin Rhythm Airplay chart on May 29, 2014.

Track listing

Charts

References

2013 singles
Becky G songs
Pitbull (rapper) songs
Kemosabe Records singles
2013 songs
Songs written by Dr. Luke
Songs written by Kshmr
Songs written by Max Martin
Songs written by Cirkut (record producer)
Songs written by Gregor Salto
Songs written by Becky G
Songs written by Pitbull (rapper)
Songs written by DJ Buddha